Tim Benjamin may refer to:

Tim Benjamin (composer) (born 1975), Anglo-French composer
Tim Benjamin (sprinter) (born 1982), British track and field sprinter